The Journal of Computational Physics is a bimonthly scientific journal covering computational physics that was established in 1966 and is published by Elsevier. As of 2015, its editor-in-chief is Rémi Abgrall (University of Zurich). According to the Journal Citation Reports, Journal of Computational Physics has a 2021 impact factor of 4.645, ranking it third out of 56 in the category Physics, Mathematical.

See also
List of fluid mechanics journals

References

External links 
 

English-language journals
Physics journals
Elsevier academic journals
Publications established in 1966
Biweekly journals